Skyride is one of the few remaining dual gondola lifts in the world located at Six Flags Great Adventure in Jackson Township, New Jersey. The Skyride carries passengers on a 1/3 mile, four-minute trip between the Fantasy Forest and the Frontier Adventures sections of the park. It is one of the few rides to allow park guests under  in height to ride (including children and infants who cannot sit up by themselves) and may ride accompanied by a responsible adult. The Skyride is one of only four rides in the park (along with the Carousel, Big Wheel, and Safari Off Road Adventure) that allows cameras to be taken and used on the ride.

History

It was originally built for the 1964 New York World's Fair then moved to Great Adventure after the fair closed.   The Skyride originally had many more cars than it currently has, it ran with at least 30 cars per side at the World's Fair with a launch interval of 12 seconds. It currently runs up to 20 cars per side with a launch interval of 25 seconds. The cars currently in service were relocated from Six Flags Great America in Gurnee, IL, when the Southern Cross and Eagle's Flight Skyride were removed in order to make room for the construction of additional attractions. Two of the original World's Fair cars, with their roofs removed, are currently used as maintenance cars.

The ride

The ride consists of two continuous cable loops, held up by six evenly-dispersed support towers. The cars hang from this moving cable, each one carrying up to four passengers (or 680 pounds). These are open cars with four seats (two rows of two, facing each other). At each station (one at Fantasy Forest, one at Frontier Adventures), a large bullwheel with a pulley-like groove rotates the direction in which the cable is moving. Incoming cars are transferred from the moving cable to a stationary steel track, along which the wheels of each car glide. As each car enters the station, it is "caught" and brought to a stop by a park employee, who then holds the car in place and opens the door for the passengers to exit. The car is then pushed around to the other side of the wheel, where another employee steadies the car for new passengers to enter. The door is closed and locked and the car is moved into the launcher. This holds the car in place until the proper launch interval has passed. The rides computer dispatches the cars at an appropriate interval or the employee can pull a cord which allows the car to roll down a ramp (accelerating the car to the same speed as the cable) and automatically clamp onto the cable. 2 safety sensors check to make sure the car is properly clamped onto the cable. If they fail the check the ride automatically shuts down and maintenance checks the latch before restarting the ride. Once on the cable, the wheels above each cabin are not used, but the cable transporting it is gripped by a clamp between the wheels. This skyride is a classic Von Roll type 101.

The stations

In addition to loading and unloading the cars, each of the stations performs a substantially different function. The Fantasy Forest station is the "Drive" station, its bullwheel is driven by a large electric motor, with a backup diesel engine used to unload the ride in case of a power outage. The diesel engines were replaced by Volkswagen Beetle motors in 2007. The cars are stored on sidetracks off to the side of this station when not being used.

The Frontier Adventures station is the "Tension" station, its bullwheel is linked to a 14-ton counterweight underneath the station. The counterweight keeps the cable tight and prevents the cable from falling all the way down should it slip off one of the towers. This station has a single sidetrack for storing cars during breakdowns, but is not normally used for storing cars.

The Frontier Adventures station is not wheelchair accessible, so guests who use wheelchairs may board at the Fantasy Forest station, leave their wheelchair in the station, and take a round trip (which is not otherwise allowed). Wheelchairs, strollers, large stuffed prizes, and other bulky items can be transported in their own car if necessary and picked up by their owners upon reaching the end of the ride.

Limitations and hazards

The Skyride does not run in winds exceeding . High winds can push against the cars hard enough that the cable could fall off a tower. If this did happen, safety devices on the tower would stop the cable and the counterweight would keep the cable from falling all the way to the ground. For the same reason, passengers are prohibited from shaking the gondolas. One of the towers is fitted with an anemometer. When the wind speed reaches , a warning buzzer sounds in the Fantasy Forest station. When the wind speed reaches , both cables automatically stop. At this point, the ride must be unloaded and closed, and must remain closed until one hour has passed without the wind reaching . It is also closed for any thunderstorm or other severe weather. It will normally be one of the first rides to close when severe weather is approaching the park, and one of the last rides to reopen once the severe weather passes. The cable for each side is usually replaced every ten years.

The Skyride is known to be one of the most difficult rides in the park to operate due to manual operations and the cable does not stop moving. One ride operator, the loader, is responsible for maintaining the correct spacing between cars. This is done by launching each car when the previous car has reached a predetermined point on the cable, which is generally between reaching the first tower and half way to the second on the Fantasy Forest side, and almost to the first tower on the Frontier Adventures side. There is also an "Auto-Launch" feature that sends the cars once they are locked into place in the launch mechanism. A loader has the responsibility for making sure the guests are riding safely and that the car door is secure. Another operator, the unloader, must be strong enough to catch and stop the cars, as they weigh over 1000 lbs. An unloader must also be fully alert and aware of the incoming gondolas before an accident should occur.

References

Six Flags attractions
Amusement rides manufactured by Von Roll
Amusement rides introduced in 1974
Six Flags Great Adventure
Transportation in the United States
Gondola lifts in the United States
1974 establishments in New Jersey